SS James Bennett Moore was a Liberty ship built in the United States during World War II. She was named after James Bennett Moore, who was lost at sea while he was the 2nd assistant engineer on the freighter , after the convoy (QP 13) she was travelling in strayed into an Allied minefield (SN72) 5 July 1942, off Greenland.

Construction
James Bennett Moore was laid down on 15 December 1944, under a Maritime Commission (MARCOM) contract, MC hull 2397, by J.A. Jones Construction, Brunswick, Georgia; she was sponsored by Mary Peavey, daughter of Senator John W. Thomas of Idaho, and launched on 19 January 1945.

History
She was allocated to the A.L. Burbank & Co., Ltd., on 31 January 1945. On 6 May 1948, she was laid up in the National Defense Reserve Fleet, in the Hudson River Group. On 10 October 1949, she was withdrawn from the fleet to be loaded with grain, she returned loaded on 19 October 1949. On 17 August 1950, she was withdrawn to be unload and refilled, she returned on 1 September 1950, reloaded. On 14 March 1951, she withdrew again to be unloaded but it is unclear when she returned, her status card refers to her being sent for repairs on 29 March 1951, and her being transferred to the Mobile Reserve Fleet on 2 June 1952. On 12 March 1971, she was sold to Union Minerals & Alloys, for scrapping. She was removed from the fleet on 14 June 1971.

References

Bibliography

 
 
 
 
 

 

Liberty ships
Ships built in Brunswick, Georgia
1945 ships
Hudson River Reserve Fleet
Mobile Reserve Fleet